ELP or Elp  may refer to:

 ELP Communications, an American television production company later merged into Columbia TriStar Television
 ELP Japan, an audio turntable manufacturer

Music 
 Emerson, Lake & Palmer, UK rock group
 Emerson, Lake & Powell, UK rock group, successor of the above
 El-P (born 1975), US hip-hop artist

Places 
 Elp, a town in the Netherlands

Transport 
 El Paso International Airport, in Texas
 Ellesmere Port railway station, in England
 London Buses route ELP
 Union Depot (El Paso), in Texas

Science 
 Elp culture, of the Bronze Age Netherlands
 Elastin-like polypeptides
 Elpaputih language
 × Elepogon, an intergeneric hybrid of orchids
 Ephemeride Lunaire Parisienne, a lunar theory

Other uses  
 Endangered Languages Project
 Environmental Literacy Plan
 El Phantasmo
 Saharawi People's Liberation Army (from )

See also 
 English Language Proficiency Test